Young Township is a township in Indiana County, Pennsylvania, United States. It was named after John Young, the first president judge of Indiana county. The population was 1,709 at the 2020 census. It includes the communities of Clarksburg, Coal Run (or Clune), Elders Ridge, Iselin, Jacksonville, McIntyre, Scotland, Watson's Ridge, and West Lebanon along with the "ghost towns" of Hart Town, Whiskey Run and Nesbitt Run.

Geography
According to the United States Census Bureau, the township has a total area of 34.8 square miles (90.3 km2), of which 34.8 square miles (90.2 km2)  is land and 0.03% is water.

Demographics

As of the census of 2000, there were 1,744 people, 741 households, and 489 families residing in the township. The population density was 50.1 people per square mile (19.3/km2). There were 805 housing units at an average density of 23.1/sq mi (8.9/km2). The racial makeup of the township was 98.85% White, 0.46% African American, 0.17% Native American, 0.06% Asian, and 0.46% from two or more races.

There were 741 households, out of which 27.9% had children under the age of 18 living with them, 53.3% were married couples living together, 7.7% had a female householder with no husband present, and 33.9% were non-families. 30.4% of all households were made up of individuals, and 16.6% had someone living alone who was 65 years of age or older. The average household size was 2.35 and the average family size was 2.94.

In the township the population was spread out, with 22.7% under the age of 18, 8.0% from 18 to 24, 28.2% from 25 to 44, 24.1% from 45 to 64, and 17.1% who were 65 years of age or older. The median age was 40 years. For every 100 females, there were 94.0 males. For every 100 females age 18 and over, there were 91.7 males.

The median income for a household in the township was $29,871, and the median income for a family was $38,750. Males had a median income of $31,250 versus $20,625 for females. The per capita income for the township was $15,367. About 10.2% of families and 13.6% of the population were below the poverty line, including 23.0% of those under age 18 and 6.9% of those age 65 or over.

References

External links
Information about Young Township

Townships in Indiana County, Pennsylvania
Townships in Pennsylvania